is a tram station operated by Toei's  Tokyo Sakura Tram located in Arakawa, Tokyo Japan. It is 1.0 kilometre from the terminus of the Tokyo Sakura Tram at Minowabashi Station.

Layout
Arakawa-nichome Station has two opposed side platforms.

Surrounding area
 Arakawa Sizen Park . Yuinomori Arakawa (library and community facility).

History
 April 1, 1913: Station opened

Railway stations in Tokyo
Railway stations in Japan opened in 1913
Arakawa, Tokyo